The 2020–21 Florida Gators men's basketball team represented the University of Florida during the 2020–21 NCAA Division I men's basketball season. The team was led by sixth-year head coach Mike White, and played their home games at the O'Connell Center in Gainesville, Florida as a member of the Southeastern Conference. They finished the season 15-10, 9-7 in SEC Play to finish in 5th place. They defeated Vanderbilt in the second round of the SEC tournament before losing in the quarterfinals to Tennessee. They received an at-large bid to the NCAA tournament where they defeated Virginia Tech in the first round before getting upset in the second round by Oral Roberts.

Roster

Schedule and results

|-
!colspan=12 style=|Non-conference Regular season

|-
!colspan=12 style=|SEC Regular season

|-
!colspan=12 style=|SEC tournament

|-
!colspan=12 style=|NCAA tournament

|-

The games against UMass Lowell and Virginia were canceled due to Florida pausing team activities for one week due to positive COVID-19 tests and contact tracing protocols.  The Oklahoma game was canceled later in the week, moving the home-and-home series back one year.
The games against North Florida, Florida Atlanta, Florida A&M, and James Madison were postponed following the hospitalization of Keyontae Johnson after collapsing mid-game during the first half of the Florida State game.

Rankings

^Coaches did not release a Week 1 poll.

References

Florida Gators men's basketball seasons
Florida Gators
Florida Gators men's basketball
Florida Gators men's basketball
Florida